Calliobasis bilix, common name the balanced top shell, is a species of extremely small deep water sea snail, a marine gastropod mollusk in the family Seguenziidae.

Description
The height of the shell attains  4 mm.

References

External links
 To Encyclopedia of Life
 To World Register of Marine Species
 Seashells of New South Wales: Calliobasis bilix
 

bilix
Gastropods described in 1905